Ballard Canyon AVA is an American Viticultural Area located in Santa Barbara County, California and established on October 2, 2013 by the Alcohol and Tobacco Tax and Trade Bureau (TTB). The   designated area lies west of   Ballard and  Solvang townships while in the center of the  Santa Ynez Valley viticultural area, which in turn, is within the perimeter of the  larger multi-county Central Coast viticultural area. As of 2021, the Santa Ynez Valley AVA contains three other established viticultural areas:  Santa Rita Hills, which lies to the west;  Los Olivos District and Happy Canyon of Santa Barbara to the east of the Ballard Canyon. Los Olivos District borders Ballard Canyon's eastern perimeter while Santa Rita Hills and the Happy Canyon areas do not share boundaries nor overlap Ballard Canyon.  The USDA plant hardiness zone for the AVA is 9b.

Terroir 
Ballard Canyon itself is a long, thin canyon that runs in a curve from north to south and is surrounded by a myriad of smaller canyons interspersed with dry, rugged hills. The distinguishing features of the Ballard Canyon viticultural area include wind, temperature, and soils.

Climate
Winds are funneled into the Santa Ynez Valley from the Pacific Ocean via a gap between the Santa Rita Hills and the Purisima Hills. However, the north-south orientation of Ballard Canyon shelters the vineyards from the worst effects of these maritime influences. Fog flows in from the coast in the early hours of the morning and retreat again in the afternoon. The vines in the south of Ballard Canyon are exposed to the fog for a longer period of time compared to those planted at the higher elevations in the AVA's northern vineyards.  These factors, in combination with high diurnal temperature variations of approximately 40 Fahrenheit degrees (roughly 22 Celsius degrees), slows the ripening process enough that acidity levels are not compromised. The wines produced are therefore balanced and fresh.

Soil
The soils in the Ballard Canyon AVA are more uniform than in the larger Santa Ynez Valley viticultural area. They are made up of sand and clay loam with good drainage capacities. Limestone is also present in certain northern vineyard plots. Vines planted in the steeper vineyard sites are able to develop deep root systems in search of water in the area's arid environment, thereby increasing vine strength. A good level of calcium in Ballard Canyon's soils ensures the development of thick skins and increases the concentration of tannins, sugars and acids in the grapes. This helps to produce richly flavored, well-balanced wines.

Wine Industry 
In April 2011, TTB received a petition from Wesley D. Hagen, a vineyard manager and winemaker, on behalf of 26 other vintners and grape growers in the Ballard Canyon area which has long been highly regarded for its red wines made from Syrah and Grenache.

References

External links
 Ballard Canyon AVA 
  Ballard Canyon Santa Barbara Vintners Association
  Santa Ynez Wine Country Association
  TTB AVA Map

 
American Viticultural Areas of Southern California
American Viticultural Areas
California wine
Geography of Santa Barbara County, California
2013 establishments in California